Nickelodeon Teen (formerly Nickelodeon 4Teen) is a French pay television channel owned by Paramount Networks EMEAA. It is the French equivalent of TeenNick, though with its French branding meeting domestic language policies, along with "Nick" sounding similar to a French profanity.

History
Nickelodeon 4Teen launched on 19 November 2014, targeting tweens and teenagers. It changed its branding to Nickelodeon Teen on 26 August 2017.

Programming

Current programming
Are You Afraid of the Dark?(As-tu peur du noir?)
 Just Add Magic (La magie en plus)
 Big Time Rush
 Just Add Magic: Mystery City
 Henry Danger
 iCarly
 School of Rock
 Side Hustle
 Sam & Cat (Sam et Cat)
 Hunter Street
 The Thundermans (Les Thunderman)
 Goldie's Oldies
 The Haunted Hathaways (3 fantômes chez les Hathaway)
 All That
 Nickelodeon Kids' Choice Awards
 True Jackson, VP (True Jackson)
 Victorious
 Game Shakers
 Max & Shred
Danger Force
Nicky, Ricky, Dicky & Dawn
Noobees
School of Rock
Spyders
Tyler Perry's Young Dylan

Former programming
 Bucket and Skinner's Epic Adventures (Bucket et Skinner)
 Bella and the Bulldogs (Bella et les Bulldogs)
 Every Witch Way (Teen Witch)
 Fresh
 Drake & Josh (Drake et Josh)
 Cousin Skeeter
 The Elephant Show (Son Altesse Alex)
 Genie in the House (Génial Génie)
 House of Anubis (Anubis)
Instant Mom (L'Apprentie Maman)
 I Am Frankie
 See Dad Run (Cours papa cours)
 Supah Ninjas
 Just Jordan (Jordan)
 Kenan & Kel (Kenan et Kel)
 Make It Pop
 Power Rangers Super Megaforce
 Power Rangers Super Samurai
 Power Rangers Megaforce
 Power Rangers Samurai
 Romeo! (Roméo!)
 Orange Carpet
 Ned's Declassified School Survival Guide (Ned)
Unfabulous (Allie Singer)
 Zoey 101'' (Zoé)

References

Television channels and stations established in 2014
Television stations in France
Teen
2014 establishments in France